Sir Austin Bradford Hill  (8 July 1897 – 18 April 1991) was an English epidemiologist and statistician, pioneered the randomised clinical trial and, together with Richard Doll, demonstrated the connection between cigarette smoking and lung cancer. Hill is widely known for pioneering the "Bradford Hill" criteria for determining a causal association.

Early life
Hill was born in London, son of Sir Leonard Erskine Hill FRS, a distinguished physiologist, and Janet Alexander. He was the grandson of noted scholar George Birkbeck Hill. As a child he lived at the family home, Osborne House, Loughton, Essex; he was educated at Chigwell School, Essex. He served as a pilot in the First World War but was invalided out when he contracted tuberculosis. Two years in hospital and two years of convalescence put a medical qualification out of the question and he took a degree in economics by correspondence at London University.

Career

In 1922, Hill went to work for the Industry Fatigue Research Board. He was associated with the medical statistician Major Greenwood and, to improve his statistical knowledge, Hill attended lectures by Karl Pearson. When Greenwood accepted a chair at the newly formed London School of Hygiene and Tropical Medicine, Hill moved with him, becoming Reader in Epidemiology and Vital Statistics in 1933 and Professor of Medical Statistics in 1947.

Hill had a distinguished career in research and teaching and as author of a very successful textbook, Principles of Medical Statistics, but he is famous for two landmark studies. He was the statistician on the Medical Research Council Streptomycin in Tuberculosis Trials Committee and their study evaluating the use of streptomycin in treating tuberculosis, is generally accepted as the first randomised clinical trial. The use of randomisation in agricultural experiments had been pioneered by Ronald Aylmer Fisher. The second study was rather a series of studies with Richard Doll on smoking and lung cancer. The first paper, published in 1950, was a case-control study comparing lung cancer patients with matched controls. Doll and Hill also started a long-term prospective study of smoking and health. This was an investigation of the smoking habits and health of 40,701 British doctors for several years (British doctors study). Fisher was in profound disagreement with the conclusions and procedures of the smoking/cancer work and from 1957 he criticised the work in the press and in academic publications.

In 1965, built upon the work of Hume and Popper, Hill suggested several aspects of causality in medicine and biology, which have remained in use by epidemiologists to date.

On Hill's death in 1991, Peter Armitage wrote, "to anyone involved in medical statistics, epidemiology or public health, Bradford Hill was quite simply the world's leading medical statistician."

Honours
In 1950–52, Hill was president of the Royal Statistical Society and was awarded its Guy Medal in Gold in 1953.

Hill was made a Fellow of the Royal Society (FRS) in 1954. Fisher was actually one of the proposers. The certificate of election read
Has, by the application of statistical methods, made valuable contributions to our knowledge of the incidence and aetiology of industrial diseases, of the effects of internal migration upon mortality rates, and of the natural and experimental epidemiology of various infections, for example of the risks of an attack of poliomyelitis following inoculation procedures and of the risk of congenital abnormalities being precipitated by maternal rubella in the pregnant woman. Since the war he has demonstrated in an exact and controlled field survey the association between cigarette smoking and the incidence of cancer of the lung, and has been the leader in the development in medicine of the precise experimental methods now used nationally and internationally in the evaluation of new therapeutic and prophylactic agents.

He was appointed a Commander of the Order of the British Empire (CBE) in the 1951 Birthday Honours and knighted in the 1961 Birthday Honours.

Bibliography
 "Principles of Medical Statistics" (1937) London: The Lancet, 1937.

Notes

References

External links

 Doll has some comments on his teacher and boss in Interview with Richard Doll
 Photographs of Hill: on University of York site on National Portrait Gallery site

1897 births
1991 deaths
Military personnel from London
Royal Air Force personnel of World War I
Royal Air Force airmen
People from Loughton
British epidemiologists
English statisticians
Fellows of the Royal Society
Knights Bachelor
People educated at Chigwell School
Presidents of the Royal Statistical Society
Academics of the London School of Hygiene & Tropical Medicine
Tobacco researchers
Commanders of the Order of the British Empire
Medical doctors from London